Tedorigawa No.3 Dam  is a gravity dam located in Ishikawa Prefecture in Japan. The dam is used for power production. The catchment area of the dam is 527.5 km2. The dam impounds about 33  ha of land when full and can store 4247 thousand cubic meters of water. The construction of the dam was started on 1972 and completed in 1978.

See also
List of dams in Japan

References

Dams in Ishikawa Prefecture